State Highway 1, sometimes abbreviated as SH-1, is a  highway maintained by the U.S. state of Oklahoma. It travels through the southeastern part of the state, nicknamed Little Dixie. SH-1 is signed east and west.

Route description

Madill to Ada

SH-1 eastbound begins at US-177/SH-199 between Mannsville and Madill. It then winds northward to the town of Ravia, and becomes concurrent with SH-7 at through Mill Creek. Highway 7 splits off to the west soon after and SH-1 continues northward to Hickory, Oklahoma and Roff.

In Fitzhugh SH-1 becomes a multilane highway. It then becomes a freeway serving as part of a beltway around Ada. Through Ada it is briefly concurrent with US-377/SH-99.

Ada to Calvin
After leaving Ada the highway becomes gradually more hilly and curvy, and turns northeast.  Between the towns of Allen and Calvin, the road roughly follows the south bank of the Canadian River, though the river is not actually visible from the road.

At Calvin, the road becomes concurrent with US-270 and intersects with US-75.

Calvin to Talihina
Through some parts of this section of the highway, the SH-1 signage is omitted in favor of US-270 signs.

Continuing east, the highway passes just north of Stuart, Oklahoma and through Arpelar. It then intersects with the Indian Nation Turnpike just west of the McAlester city limits.  Through McAlester the street is also signed as Carl Albert Parkway.

East of McAlester the road continues as a four-lane road (much of it divided) connecting many small towns east of the city: Krebs, Alderson, Bache, Dow, Haileyville, and Hartshorne.

West of Hartshorne US-270 splits off from SH-1 and it continues east concurrent with SH-63. For  SH-1 and SH-63 overlap State Highway 2. Here the road continues east and becomes even more hilly and curvy as it heads toward the Winding Stair Mountains. From this point forward, the road contains a large number of hairpin turns – some even as drastic as 180-degrees.

The Talimena Drive

8 miles (12.8 km) northeast of Talihina, SH-1 splits off of US-271. This begins the final 26 miles (41 km) of the highway, officially named the Talimena Drive because it runs from Talihina to Mena, Arkansas. This highway, a National Scenic Byway since January 2005, runs through the Ouachita National Forest and the Winding Stair Mountains, and has no shoulders. It features special 'vistas' – parking lots placed off the road at especially scenic parts of the highway. At either end of the Talimena Drive, signs are posted stating that the highway is closed during cold and foggy conditions, and that no snow control is provided.

The height of the mountain peaks on the Drive causes the oaks and pines to grow so much slower and shorter than the rest of Southeast Oklahoma.  On a hot summer day, the winds on the Talimena Drive may be a good 10 degrees cooler than other nearby locations.

SH-1 ends at the Arkansas state line. The roadbed continues on as Highway 88, toward Queen Wilhelmina State Park and the city of Mena, Arkansas.

History
State Highway 1 was historically an entrance into Indian Territory from the state of Arkansas.  The Oklahoma Choctaw came to these mountain tops in the early 1830s.  Stage coach robbers, train robbers and bank robbers all came to hide on these mountain peaks bringing in their horses for much needed breaks.  Horse Thief Springs is marked at its vista where one can still rest before continuing down the Drive.

SH-1 is the latest of many Oklahoma state highways assigned the number 1. The current route opened in 1969. In this case, the number 1 was assigned due to the scenery along the highway.

Junction list

References

External links

SH-1 at OKHighways
Talimena Scenic Drive
Twisties of the Talimena Drive

001
Ada, Oklahoma
Transportation in Marshall County, Oklahoma
Transportation in Johnston County, Oklahoma
Transportation in Murray County, Oklahoma
Transportation in Pontotoc County, Oklahoma
Transportation in Hughes County, Oklahoma
Transportation in Pittsburg County, Oklahoma
Transportation in Latimer County, Oklahoma
Transportation in Le Flore County, Oklahoma